was the forty-first of the fifty-three stations of the Tōkaidō. It is located in former Owari Province in what is now part of the Atsuta-ku section of the city of Nagoya, in Aichi Prefecture, Japan. It was six km from Narumi-juku, the preceding post station.

History
In addition to being a post station on the Tōkaidō, Miya-juku was also part of the Minoji (a minor route which runs to Tarui-juku on the Nakasendō) and the Saya Kaidō. As a result, it had the most hatago of any post station along the Tōkaidō,  with two honjin, one wakihonjin and 248 lesser inns.  

The classic ukiyo-e print by Andō Hiroshige (Hōeidō edition) from 1831 to 1834 depicts two gangs of men dragging a portable shrine cart (not shown) past a huge torii gate. The torii gate is the symbol of a Shinto shrine, and the name of "Miya" also means a "Shinto shrine". The shrine in question is the famous Atsuta Shrine, one of the most famous in Japan and a popular pilgrimage destination in the Edo period.  The area is now part of downtown Nagoya metropolis.

Neighboring post towns
Tōkaidō
Narumi-juku - Miya-juku - Kuwana-juku
Saya Kaidō
Miya-juku (starting location) - Iwazuka-juku
Minoji
Miya-juku (starting location) - Nagoya-juku

Further reading
Carey, Patrick. Rediscovering the Old Tokaido:In the Footsteps of Hiroshige. Global Books UK (2000). 
Chiba, Reiko. Hiroshige's Tokaido in Prints and Poetry. Tuttle. (1982) 
Taganau, Jilly. The Tokaido Road: Travelling and Representation in Edo and Meiji Japan. RoutledgeCurzon (2004).

References

Stations of the Tōkaidō
Stations of the Tōkaidō in Aichi Prefecture